Meadowbrook is a census-designated place in Riverside County, California. The 2010 United States census reported Meadowbrook's population was 3,185.

Geography
According to the United States Census Bureau, the CDP covers an area of 6.9 square miles (17.8 km), 99.66% of it land and 0.34% of it water.

Demographics
At the 2010 census Meadowbrook had a population of 3,185. The racial makeup of Meadowbrook was 2,034 (63.9%) White, 130 (4.1%) African American, 19 (0.6%) Native American, 51 (1.6%) Asian, 4 (0.1%) Pacific Islander, 798 (25.1%) from other races, and 149 (4.7%) from two or more races. Hispanic or Latino of any race were 1,765 persons (55.4%).

The census reported that 3,179 people (99.8% of the population) lived in households, 6 (0.2%) lived in non-institutionalized group quarters, and no one was institutionalized.

There were 982 households, 374 (38.1%) had children under the age of 18 living in them, 508 (51.7%) were opposite-sex married couples living together, 106 (10.8%) had a female householder with no husband present, 78 (7.9%) had a male householder with no wife present.  There were 70 (7.1%) unmarried opposite-sex partnerships, and 2 (0.2%) same-sex married couples or partnerships. 228 households (23.2%) were one person and 91 (9.3%) had someone living alone who was 65 or older. The average household size was 3.24.  There were 692 families (70.5% of households); the average family size was 3.83.

The age distribution was 821 people (25.8%) under the age of 18, 360 people (11.3%) aged 18 to 24, 704 people (22.1%) aged 25 to 44, 864 people (27.1%) aged 45 to 64, and 436 people (13.7%) who were 65 or older.  The median age was 37.1 years. For every 100 females, there were 105.2 males.  For every 100 females age 18 and over, there were 109.4 males.

There were 1,174 housing units at an average density of 170.7 per square mile, of the occupied units 656 (66.8%) were owner-occupied and 326 (33.2%) were rented. The homeowner vacancy rate was 2.5%; the rental vacancy rate was 9.7%.  2,052 people (64.4% of the population) lived in owner-occupied housing units and 1,127 people (35.4%) lived in rental housing units.

External links

References

Census-designated places in Riverside County, California
Census-designated places in California